The Transatlantic Trophy (initially called Anglo-American Match Races) was an annual series of motorcycle races between the United Kingdom and America held from 1971 to 1988 and again in 1991. They were mostly held over the Easter weekend at Brands Hatch, Mallory Park and Oulton Park, although some races were held at Donington Park and Snetterton. Three different specifications of motorcycles were used in the series at various times: AMA/F750, Superbike and GP. 

British journalists, Gavin Trippe and Bruce Cox, ran California based Motor Cycle Weekly and promoted motorcycle races in the US. The pair were keen to promote American racers in the UK. They met with Chris Lowe of Motor Circuit Developments (MCD), who ran Brands Hatch, Oulton Park and Mallory Park circuits, and Jim Swift of the British Motorcycle Racing Club at the 1970 Daytona 200 and the plan for the Transatlantic Trophy was formulated. Ron Grant, the leader of the US Suzuki team supported the scheme. Lowe approached BSA/Triumph who agreed to supply 750 cc racing triples for the riders and to support the series.

BSA/Triumph withdrew after the 1971 event and John Player became the title sponsor from 1972.  The name of the series was changed to Transatlantic Trophy in the same year.

The initial format was 2 races at each of the three tracks over the Easter weekend: Brands Hatch (Good Friday), Mallory Park (Easter Sunday) and Oulton Park (Easter Monday). Marlboro became the title sponsor in 1979. Motor Circuit Developments sold Mallory Park in late 1982, and for 1983 Snetterton Circuit was used as the third circuit. To fit in with Snetterton's schedule the races were moved to May Day weekend. There were allegations of financial irregularities by Motor Circuit Developments, in late 1983. Tom Wheatcroft, owner of Donington Park, stepped in and the entire series was staged at Donington Park from 1984. At this point Bruce Cox became solely responsible for the selection of the American team via a three yearcontract with the American Motorcycle Association. There was no title sponsor for 1984 but Shell Oils sponsored the series from 1985 to 1987. Brands Hatch returned as a venue in 1987, with 3 races at brands and six at Donington.

Donington was to host the inaugural round of the Superbike World Championship on Easter Sunday 1988. For the mutual benefit of both WSB and the Transatlantic Match (which both used similar specification machines) the Transatlanic series was expanded to four teams and renamed the Eurolantic Challenge as it included European riders. No matches were hels in 1989 and 1990. The final match, known as the Transatlantic Superbike Challenge that year, was held at Brands Hatch and Mallory Park in May 1991.

In 1984 Honda works rider Freddie Spencer crashed and broke bones in his feet. This caused him to miss the Spanish GP. Team mate Ron Haslam had also crashed. Honda withdrew its support for the non-championship event. Other manufactures followed suit over the next few years. Without the top riders the series declined and was cancelled after the 1991 matches.

Matches

1971

The inaugural Anglo-American Match Races event matched a 5 man British team with a 6 man American team, although only 5 Americans could race in any one race. American captain Gary Nixon fell in practice for the first race and broke his wrist so was unable to ride in any of the races. All riders were on BSA/Triumph 750 cc triples.

BSA/Triumph had updated the racing triples for the 1971 Daytona 200, which BSA works rider Dick Mann had won. The changes included the compact "lowboy" frame, which was lower and lighter but had more ground clearance. Disc brakes had been fitted and the engines produced slightly more power. There were only a limited number of 1971 machines available. The British team plus Mann and Nixon received the upgraded machines. The rest of the American team used 1970 machines. This led to claims that the American team was disadvantaged.

The UK won all races and the series 183-137. Ray Pickrell and Paul Smart were the top scorers.

1972

The series was sponsored by John Player and the name changed to Transatlantic Trophy. No longer a one-make series, the BSAs and Triumphs were joined by Nortons, Suzukis and a Harley Davidson. The British won the series 252-210. Cal Rayborn, on an obsolete Harley Davidson as the factory refused to let him use his works machine, and Ray Pickrell were the top scorers with 3 wins each. Don Emde crashed heavily during practice at Oulton Park. His bike ended up in the lake and was hosed down by the Fire Brigade to remove the mud.

1973

BSA-Triumph was now part of Norton Villiers Triumph and the BSA brand had been dropped so only Triumph badged triples were entered. Kawasaki bikes appeared for the first time, making 5 different marques on the grid. Britain won the series 416-398. Yvon Duhamel and Peter Williams were the top scorers in the wet races.

1974

Yamaha motorcycles entered the series for the first time this year with the Yamaha TZ750. Britain won the series 416-401 although American Kenny Roberts was the top scorer with 4 wins. Roberts bike, which was fitted with the newly introduced slick tyres, nearly failed scrutineering for "bald tyres".

1975
The Brands Hatch races were cancelled due to snow. The first race at Mallory Park started dry but snow started to fall near the end of the race. The second race was wet and shortened from 20 to 15 laps. Dave Aldana was the top scorer, although Kenny Roberts had won 3 races. The American team had their first series win scoring 279-242.

1976

The British team had included John Newbold, but he dropped out. Reserve Steve Parrish was promoted to a full team member and Ron Haslam brought in as the reserve. Phil McDonald was to have been in the American team but was injured prior to the matches.

Norton had commissioned Cosworth to build a twin-cylinder engine based on their highly successful DFV Formula 1 engine. Dave Croxford entered the series on one of the Cosworth-Nortons but the underdeveloped machine performed poorly at Brands and was withdrawn for the other two rounds.

Steve Baker was the top scorer with 4 wins.

1977

The American team was to consist of Dave Aldana, Steve Baker, Randy Cleek, Pat Evans, Pat Hennen, Ron Pierce, Kenny Roberts, Gary Scott and Dave Emde as reserve. Following a disagreement with his sponsor Pierce withdrew from the team. Emde was promoted to a full team member and Skip Aksland brought in as reserve. Evans was killed at the Imola Circuit the weekend prior to the Transatlantic Trophy and Cleek killed in a road accident on his way back from the Imola track. Pierce re-joined the team, Aksland was promoted to a full team member and Kevin Stafford introduced as reserve.

Barry Sheene won one race for the UK but the other five races were won by Americans; Roberts won four races and Hennen one. Hennen was the top scorer. The Americans won the series 405-380.

1978

Barry Sheene, Mick Grant and Dave Potter were seeded into the team. The rest of the teams was decided by lap times during a qualifying session prior to the first race at Brands Hatch.

The UK won the series 435-379 in front of a combined crowd of 150,000. Pat Hennen was the top scorer.

1979

Barry Sheene, Mick Grant, Dave Potter, Barry Ditchburn, Tom Herron and Steve Parrish were seeded into the British team. The remaining three members qualified for their places in a qualifying session on the day before the first race at the Brands Hatch round.

The American obtained the highest winning margin to date, 448-352, winning all 3 rounds. Mike Baldwin was the top scorer.

1980

AMA Superbike Championship specification machines were permitted, allowing Dave Aldana and Wes Cooley to use 1,024cc Yoshimura Suzuki machines. Americans won all the races: Kenny Roberts 3, Freddie Spencer 2 and Randy Mamola 1. The USA won the series 442-370 and Roberts was the top scorer. 140,000 fans attended the races.

1981

The American team was depleted for the 1981 races. World Champion Kenny Roberts was unavailable for the series as he was required by Yamaha to test their new square four GP racer. Dave Aldana and Mike Baldwin were competing in the 24 Hours of Le Mans endurance race for Honda. Yoshimura and Suzuki refused to allow Wes Cooley to use his Superbike for the series and he used a borrowed a 750 Yamaha for the races. A Honda America Superbike wasn't available for Freddie Spencer to use and had to compete on a borrowed Suzuki RG500.

Randy Mamola won three races for the US. John Newbold was the top points scorer for Great Britain, who won the series 466-345..

1982
The American team was again understrength this year with Kenny Roberts and Randy Mamola testing GP machines. Freddie Spencer crashed in the first race and destroyed his machine. Without a spare available he was out for the rest of the match. Barry Sheene won 5 of the 6 races. A mistake on the last lap of the other race while in the lead allowed Roger Marshall to pass and deprive Sheene of a $40,0000 bonus for winning all the races.

Sheene was the top scorer with Dave Aldana the top scoring American. Britain won the series 491-313.

1983

Motor Circuit Developments (MCD), the owners of the 3 circuits used for the races, Brands Hatch, Mallory Park and Oulton Park, came under financial pressure from their parent company, Eagle Star Insurance in 1982. This resulted in MCD selling Mallory Park in late 1982. Snetterton was owned by MCD and was chosen to replace Mallory Park. To fit into Snetterton's schedule, the Trophy races were pushed back from Easter to May Day weekend and the order of races reversed. Oulton Park held the first races and Brands Hatch the last.

The later running of the races meant the GP season had started and Honda would not sanction Freddie Spencer taking part. Mike Baldwin fell in the first race and broke three toes, putting him out of the rest of the races. As there were no reserve riders, the American team raced with a man short. Kenny Roberts and Eddie Lawson were both on the Yamaha square 4 680 cc OW69 that they had scored a 1-2 at that year's Daytona 200. But the wet conditions and tight circuits didn't allow them to make full use of the considerable power the Yamaha made.

Ron Haslam was the top scorer and won four races, Randy Mamola won the other two. Britain won the series 245-198.

1984

There were allegations of financial irregularities by Motor Circuit Developments, owners of the circuits the matches were run on, in late 1983 and the future of the matches was in doubt. Tom Wheatcroft, owner of Donington Park, stepped in and arranged for the series to be staged at Donington. The races were run at Donington with 3 races each day on Easter Sunday and Monday in front of an 85,000 crowd. 

The British team included New Zealander Graeme Crosby and Australian Wayne Gardner was billed as the British Commonwealth.

The American team included the top four of the 1983 GP Championship. Wayne Rainey was injured in a crash in practice and didn't compete in the races. Freddie Spencer crashed in the races and broke bones in both his feet.

Americans won all the races; Randy Mamola winning three, Spencer two and Kenny Roberts one, and won the series 259-136.

1985
The match returned to its usual format of two races a day on Good Friday, Easter Sunday and Easter Monday which was less demanding for the riders. Honda refused to let Freddie Spencer take part and Yamaha blocked Eddie Lawson's participation. Kenny Roberts was busy putting together a 500 cc GP team, leaving Randy Mamola and Mike Baldwin to lead a team of mostly non-factory riders.

Wayne Gardner, the Australian riding for Britain, won three races and Mamola two. Britain won the series 336-254.

1986

With the lack of American riders competing in GP racing and the rise in popularity of Superbikes both sides of the Atlantic, the series was run for Superbikes only. With the top US riders tied to GP contracts, the American team consisted of riders not well known outside the US.

As he was unable to use his GP bike, Honda gave Ron Haslam a tuned version of the VFR750 to use. The bike blew up in practice leaving Haslam without a machine for the races. Haslam brought a new road-going version of the VFR750 from a local dealer, stripped off as many road going parts and fitted racing tyres. The tyres were intended for a 250 but were the largest that would fit on the bike. It rained during the first race making the lack of power and ground clearance compared to the full-blown superbikes less of a problem. Haslam finished in third place.

8 races were run over the Easter weekend. Kevin Schwantz won 4 and Fred Merkel two. Britain beat the USA 314-214. Kevin Schwantz was the top scorer with 84 points.

1987
Brands Hatch returned as a venue, with 3 races on Good Friday. Donington hosted six races on Easter Sunday and Monday. A 12 man British team were matched against an 11 man American team. Only the top ten riders of each team were awarded points in races. The motorcycles were to American Superbike specification. 1987 American captain Fred Merkel couldn't agree terms for 1988 so wasn't in the team. Three Canadians joined the American team: Michel Mercier and Gary Goodfellow with the backing of Suzuki Canada and Reuben McMurter from Yamaha Canada. American Bubba Shobert crashed in practice and was unable to compete in the races.

The intense rivalry between Kevin Schwantz and Wayne Rainey carried over into the match races giving the British audience a preview of future battling between the pair in GP racing.

All the races were won by Americans, Wayne Rainey won 5 of the races and Kevin Schwantz 4. America won the series 993.5-745.5.

1988
Donington was to host the inaugural round of the Superbike World Championship on Easter Sunday. For the mutual benefit of both WSB and the Transatlantic Match (which both used similar specification machines) the Transatlanic series was expanded to four teams and renamed the Eurolantic Challenge as it included European riders. For the promotors this allowed them to spread the costs over two series, and for the riders this offered the prospect of extra payday.

The British No 1 team were led by Ron Haslam and the riders were all factory backed. The American team was led by Bubba Shobert on a works Honda VFR750. For the first time, Yoshimura Suzuki sent a factory crew to support Doug Polen and Scott Gray. Four Canadians joined the American team on works bikes.

Norton had introduced a twin rotor Wankel engined racer, the RC588. Although nominally 588 cc, the FIM had yet to agree with Norton the method of measuring displacement of the rotary engine. Until this was resolved the Norton could only race in national and non-championship races. Two machines were entered into the Eurolantic Challenge, ridden by Trevor Nation and Simon Buckmaster. This would be the first tie the machines were raced.

There were 3 races at Brands Hatch on Good Friday and 3 races at Donington on Easter Monday (the WSB races being on Easter Sunday). Polen was the top scorer and had won four races. Shobert had won the other two. The British No 1 team were overall winners with 586 points, the Americans second with 570 points. Most of the European team left after the WSB and didn't compete on the Monday. This was reflected in their score of 287 points. The British No 2 team scored 281 points.

1991
The series consisted of three races at Mallory Park and three at Brands Hatch, the series was called the Transatlantic Superbike Challenge and run in early May. The British team, led by captain Ron Haslam, was well known to racing fans but apart from captain Freddie Spencer, the American team were relatively unknown. Canadian Miguel Duhamel, son of Yvon Duhamel, who had competed in the 1973 and 1974 matches, was in the  American team. 

Ray Stringer won all three races at Brands Hatch. Haslam won two and Rob McElnea one at Mallory. Britain won the series 625-161 and Stringer was the top scorer.

Revivals
Triumph Motorcycles Ltd revived the concept in 1996 with a single-make 3 race match at Donington using the 900 cc Speed Triple. Amongst the Americans competing was Dave Aldana, who had competed in the first Anglo-American Match Races in 1971. Britain won overall 614-426.

The concept was again revived in May 2015 as part of the MCN Festival of Motorcycling at the East of England Showground when a Transatlantic Trophy was staged between British and American teams flat track racing. The event was repeated at the 2016 show.

In late 2015, MotoAmerica and BSB officials looked into the possibility of reviving the Transatlantic Trophy races, with races at three different circuits over a long weekend.

References

External links
 

Motorcycle road racing series
Motorcycle racing in the United Kingdom
1971 establishments in the United Kingdom
1991 disestablishments in the United Kingdom
Recurring sporting events established in 1971
Recurring sporting events disestablished in 1991